The 2021 Warrington Borough Council election took place on 6 May 2021 to elect members of Warrington Borough Council in England. This was on the same day as other local elections. All 58 seats were up for election.

These elections were originally scheduled for May 2020, but were delayed by one year due to the COVID-19 pandemic.

The Labour Party retained overall control of Warrington Borough Council after winning 35 of the 58 seats.

Results

Council composition 
Prior to the election the composition of the council was:

After the election the composition of the council was:

Lib Dem – Liberal Democrats
Con – Conservative
IND – Independent

Ward Results 
Incumbent councillors are denoted by an asterisk (*). References:

Appleton

Bewsey and Whitecross

Birchwood

Burtonwood & Winwick

Chapelford and Old Hall

Culcheth, Glazebury & Croft

Fairfield and Howley

Grappenhall

Great Sankey North and Whittle Hall

Great Sankey South

Latchford East

Latchford West

Lymm North and Thelwall

Lymm South

Orford

Penketh and Cuerdley

Poplars and Hulme

Poulton North

Poulton South

Rixton and Woolston

Stockton Heath

Westbrook

References 

Warrington
2021
2020s in Cheshire